Boise State Public Radio is Idaho's largest nonprofit, listener-supported NPR member station, reaching metropolitan and rural areas. As the only sources of quality public radio news, classical music, jazz and unique cultural programming, our radio stations are distinct in their mission, their audience and their partnerships.

Stations and services
KBSU-FM in Boise, Idaho airs classical music and other entertainment programming from American Public Media and Public Radio International. KBSX, also located in Boise, airs news and information programming from NPR, PRI, APM and the BBC, as well as locally produced news and information programs, including the nationally distributed program Reader's Corner with Bob Kustra''.

KBSW in Twin Falls, Idaho airs a mix of programming from KBSU-FM and KBSX, as well as some local programming produced at a satellite studio at the College of Southern Idaho.

A full-time jazz format, named "Idaho's Jazz Station," airs on KBSK in McCall, and also on HD Radio as KBSU-FM HD2 Boise. This format aired on KBSU-AM and KEZJ-AM prior to July 2007.

Boise State Public Radio is the lead station for the Mountain West News Bureau, a partnership of stations providing news coverage of the Rocky Mountain West.

History
The network's roots date back to 1957, when KBJC was launched by what was then Boise Junior College as a carrier current station. It originally operated only when school was in session, and was a typical freeform college radio station. The station grew with the school, increasing its operating hours when BJC was upgraded to four-year status. The call letters changed to KBSC after Boise College was taken over by the state in 1967, and changed to the current KBSU after it was granted university status. In 1976, the station was granted a full FM license, and went on the air for the first time that fall. Gradually, the station began transitioning away from the freeform format, ultimately joining NPR in 1988. Before then, Boise was one of the largest cities in the western United States, and the only major market in Idaho, without a clear signal from NPR.

On October 18, 2022, Boise State Public Radio expanded to Lewiston and Pocatello. In Lewiston, Boise State Public Radio now operates KLCZ, formerly operated by Lewis–Clark State College, as a simulcast of KBSX; in Pocatello, it acquired the translator formerly operated by Salt Lake City NPR affiliate KUER-FM. Boise State Public Radio airs KBSU's musical programming in Pocatello, as the market receives NPR news programming from KISU-FM.

See also
 KDBI (AM)

References

External links
Official Website

BSU
BSU
Classical music radio stations in the United States
Boise State University
NPR member networks